Peter McDonald may refer to:
 Peter J. McDonald (1912–1971), Canadian politician
 Peter McDonald (critic) (born 1962), Northern Irish poet and academic
 Peter McDonald (actor) (born 1972), Irish stage and screen actor
 Peter McDonald (artist) (born 1973), Japanese/English artist
 Peter McDonald (darts player), Scottish former darts player
 Peter McDonald (demographer), Australian demographer
 Peter McDonald (cyclist) (born 1978), Australian cyclist
 Peter McDonald (footballer) (1924–2022), Irish footballer
 Peter McDonald (MP) (1836-1891), Irish Member of Parliament

See also
 Peter MacDonald (disambiguation)